The Great Malaise is a Canadian animated short film, directed by Catherine Lepage and released in 2019. A meditation on depression and anxiety, the film centres on a woman (Miranda Handford in English, Alexa-Jeanne Dubé in French) describing her personality and hopes and dreams, initially in positive terms but becoming more tentative and uncertain as her anxieties and self-doubts emerge.

The film premiered at the 2019 Sommets du cinéma d'animation, where it received an honorable mention in the category for Best Canadian Film.

The film received a Canadian Screen Award nomination for Best Animated Short at the 9th Canadian Screen Awards in 2021.

References

External links
 

2019 films
2019 animated films
Canadian animated short films
National Film Board of Canada animated short films
2010s animated short films
2010s Canadian films